Wayne Roderick Walters II (born February 27, 1954) is a former American football offensive lineman for the National Football League (NFL). Walters was drafted fourteenth overall by the Kansas City Chiefs in the 1976 NFL Draft from the University of Iowa and played with the team until the middle of the 1980 season. Walters played for the Detroit Lions and Miami Dolphins for the remainder of that 1980 season.

References

1954 births
Living people
Sportspeople from Lansing, Michigan
Players of American football from Michigan
American football offensive guards
American football offensive tackles
Iowa Hawkeyes football players
Kansas City Chiefs players
Detroit Lions players
Miami Dolphins players